Shorpy may refer to:

Shorpy.com
Shorpy Higginbotham